Africa’s World War may refer to:

 First Congo War (1996–1997)
 Second Congo War (1998–2003)